Martin Živný (born 20 March 1981) is a Czech professional association football player. He plays as a defender for FC Slovan Rosice. His biggest achievement so far is being heralded by the overly tabloidese Romanian media as a sparring-partner for his co-national Milan Baroš.

External links
 
 Profile at iDNES.cz
 

1981 births
Living people
Czech footballers
Czech Republic youth international footballers
Czech Republic under-21 international footballers
Association football midfielders
Czech First League players
FC Zbrojovka Brno players
MFK Vítkovice players
SK Austria Kärnten players
FC Dinamo București players
Liga I players
Expatriate footballers in Romania
Footballers from Brno